Maviya  Ali is an Indian politician and was a member of the  16th Legislative Assembly in  India. He represented the Deoband constituency of Uttar Pradesh and is a  member of the Samajwadi Party political party.

Early life and education
Maviya  Ali was born in Deoband, Saharanpur district. He attended the Islamia Inter  College and was educated up to the twelfth grade.

Political career
Ali was elected to the Uttar Pradesh Legislative Assembly on 17 February 2016 in an assembly by poll as a candidate of the Indian National Congress party from the Deoband seat. The seat was vacated as the MLA Rajendra Singh Rana died due to cancer.

In the 2017 Assembly election of Uttar Pradesh, Ali as a candidate of the Samajwadi Party came third after being polled 55 thousand votes and lost to the Bharatiya Janata Party's Brijesh Singh.

Controversies 
In 2015, Ali courted controversy by saying that there was "no harm" if Sadhvi Rithambara (a Hindu leader of Vishwa Hindu Parishad) was assassinated. He made this statement in response to her comments on 2015 Dadri mob lynching incident.

In August 2017, the Uttar Pradesh government passed a circular asking the madrasas (Islamic religious schools) to video record their Independence Day celebration. Ali courted controversy by saying on this matter that they were Muslims first and then they were Indians.

Posts held

See also

 Deoband (Assembly constituency)
 Sixteenth Legislative Assembly of Uttar Pradesh
 Uttar Pradesh Legislative Assembly

References 

1973 births
Indian National Congress politicians
Living people
Uttar Pradesh MLAs 2012–2017
Samajwadi Party politicians
People from Deoband